Harka is an 2022 internationally co-produced drama film, written and directed by Lotfy Nathan, in his narrative directorial debut, inspired by Mohamed Bouazizi's self-immolation that sparked the Tunisian revolution and Arab Spring between 2010 and 2011. It stars Adam Bessa, Salima Maatoug, Ikbal Harbi and Najib Allagui.

It had its world premiere at the 2022 Cannes Film Festival on 19 May 2022, in the Un Certain Regard section, where lead actor Adam Bessa won the award for Best Performance. It was released theatrically in France by Dulac Distribution on 2 November 2022.

Plot
A young Tunisian man dreams of a better life and sells contraband oil on the black market. When his father dies, he is left to take care of his two sisters, with eviction from their home looming.

Cast
 Adam Bessa as Ali 
 Salima Maatoug as Alyssa
 Ikbal Harbi as Sarra 
 Najib Allagui as Omar

Production
In July 2021, it was announced Adam Bessa had joined the cast of the film, with Lotfy Nathan directing from a screenplay he wrote. The plot was inspired by Mohamed Bouazizi's self-immolation that sparked the Tunisian revolution and Arab Spring between 2010 and 2011. The title "Harka" is translated as "burn", and it is also a Tunisian slang for a migrant who crosses the Mediterranean illegally by boat.

Filming
Principal photography took place in Tunis and Sidi Bouzid in Tunisia. Harka was the first feature film to be shot in the city of Sidi Bouzid, where the Tunisian Revolution started. Filming took place in Tunisia during the COVID-19 pandemic. Although there were no official lockdowns in the country back then, a political crisis started a few weeks into the shoot and the army removed the government from power, provoking street protests. The film's cast and crew were caught in a demonstration while filming at a bus station. Director Lotfy Nathan comes from a documentary background and incorporated elements of what was happening on the streets at the time into Harka, even casting non-professionals actors in some of the key roles. A scene featuring a protest on the streets was filmed entirely with non-professionals.

Release
The film had its world premiere at the 2022 Cannes Film Festival on 19 May 2022, in the Un Certain Regard section where lead actor Adam Bessa was awarded ex aequo the Best Performance Prize. Prior to, Dulac Distribution acquired French distribution rights to the film, and released it on theaters on 2 November 2022. It was released in Luxembourg on 11 January 2023.

Reception
On the review aggregator website Rotten Tomatoes, 100% of 5 critics' reviews are positive, with an average rating of 10/10.

Awards and nominations

References

External links
 

2022 films
2022 directorial debut films
French drama films
Tunisian drama films
Belgian drama films
Luxembourgian drama films
German drama films
American drama films
Anonymous Content films
2020s French films
Films about the Arab Spring
French films based on actual events
German films based on actual events
American films based on actual events